Roman Dittrich is a Czech sprint canoer who competed in the mid to late 1990s. He won three medals at the ICF Canoe Sprint World Championships with a silver (C-4 200 m: 1995) and two bronzes (C-4 200 m: 1994; C-4 500 m: 1993).

References

Czech male canoeists
Living people
Year of birth missing (living people)
ICF Canoe Sprint World Championships medalists in Canadian